Stewart Hall may refer to:

Buildings
Stewart Hall (Morgantown, West Virginia), listed on the National Register of Historic Places in Monongalia County, West Virginia
Stewart Hall (Pointe-Claire), a historic house and cultural centre in Pointe-Claire, Quebec

People
Stewart Hall (football coach), association football coach

See also
Stuart Hall (disambiguation)

Architectural disambiguation pages
Hall, Stewart